Al Blanchard (born June 12, 1952) is a Canadian former professional ice hockey right winger. While playing for the Kitchener Rangers during the 1971-72 season, Blanchard shared a line with Bill Barber and Jerry Byers. All three men went on to be drafted in the first round of the 1972 NHL Amateur Draft He was drafted in the first round, 10th overall, by the New York Rangers in the 1972 NHL Amateur Draft.  In March 1974, Blanchard was traded to the Los Angeles Kings for Wayne Chernecki. He never played in the National Hockey League, however, spending his professional career in the American Hockey League and International Hockey League.

Career statistics

References

External links
 

1952 births
Canadian ice hockey right wingers
Kitchener Rangers players
Living people
National Hockey League first-round draft picks
New York Rangers draft picks
Ice hockey people from Ontario
Sportspeople from Greater Sudbury
Providence Reds players
Saginaw Gears players
Springfield Indians players
Springfield Kings players